Jim Herberich (born March 8, 1963) is an American bobsledder. He competed at the 1988, 1994 and the 1998 Winter Olympics.  He graduated from Harvard University.

References

1963 births
Living people
American male bobsledders
Olympic bobsledders of the United States
Bobsledders at the 1988 Winter Olympics
Bobsledders at the 1994 Winter Olympics
Bobsledders at the 1998 Winter Olympics
People from Winchester, Massachusetts
Harvard College alumni
Sportspeople from Middlesex County, Massachusetts